Amélie de Montchalin (née Bommier, born 19 June 1985) is a French politician who has been serving as Minister for Ecological Transition and Territorial Cohesion in the government of Prime Minister Élisabeth Borne in 2022. 

De Montchalin previously served as Minister of Public Transformation and Service under Prime Minister Jean Castex (2020–2022) and as Secretary of State for European Affairs at the Ministry of Europe and Foreign Affairs (2019–2020). A member of La République En Marche! (LREM), she was elected as a member of the National Assembly in 2017 in the 6th constituency of Essonne. From 2017 to 2018, she was the La République En Marche whip in the National Assembly Finance Committee.

Early life and education
Montchalin was born in Lyon. Her father is an administrative executive and her mother is a nurse. She entered HEC Paris in 2005, graduating with a master's degree in management in 2009. During her studies, she interned for Valérie Pécresse in the National Assembly.

Career
From 2009 to 2012, Montchalin worked as an economist in charge of Eurozone analysis for Exane BNP Paribas. She then studied at the Kennedy School of Government at Harvard University, graduating with a Master of Public Administration in 2014. From September 2014 she worked at the insurance firm AXA on issues related to global public policy, data protection and climate change.

Before joining En Marche, Montchalin identified as on the political center-right. She has spoken of becoming disenchanted with François Fillon and of being inspired by Emmanuel Macron's reformist and pro-European stance, and also by what she perceives as his willingness to prioritize skills over political experience. In the 2017 legislative elections she was elected with 61.34% of the vote, defeating her opponent Françoise Couasse of the Union of Democrats and Independents. Turnout was low at 41.25%.

She is a member of the Finance Commission (French: Commission des Finances), the parliamentary committee that scrutinises public spending.

On 27 March 2019, she was appointed as Secretary of State for European Affairs, succeeding Nathalie Loiseau. She served in this post until July 2020, when she was promoted to become Minister for Transformation and Public Service. She left the Borne government in July 2022 after her defeat at the 2022 French legislative election.

See also
 2017 French legislative election
 Second Philippe government
 Castex government
 Borne government

References

1985 births
Living people
Deputies of the 15th National Assembly of the French Fifth Republic
Lycée Hoche alumni
HEC Paris alumni
Paris-Sorbonne University alumni
Harvard Kennedy School alumni
La République En Marche! politicians
Politicians from Lyon
Secretaries of State of France
Women members of the National Assembly (France)
21st-century French women politicians
Members of Parliament for Essonne